Prince of Broadway is a 2008 American independent drama film written and directed by Sean Baker.

Plot
Lucky (Adu) is a street-smart hustler working the streets of New York City, selling name brand knock-offs and turning a big profit.  However, his life experiences a shake-up when his ex-girlfriend shows up with the son he never knew he had.

Cast

Reception
The film has an 84% rating on Rotten Tomatoes based on 19 reviews, with an average rating of 7.1/10.

References

External links
 
 

2008 films
American independent films
American drama films
Films directed by Sean Baker
Films set in New York City
2000s English-language films
2000s American films